Elbert County Courthouse is a historic courthouse on Courthouse Square in downtown Elberton, Georgia, county seat of Elbert County, Georgia. The Romanesque Revival architecture building was designed by Reuben H. Hunt and constructed in 1894. It is featured on several postcards. It was listed on the National Register of Historic Places on September 18, 1980.

The brick exterior of the courthouse was painted white for several decades until the early 2000s when the exterior brick was repainted red to recreate the original appearance of red bricks.

See also
National Register of Historic Places listings in Elbert County, Georgia

References

County courthouses in Georgia (U.S. state)
Courthouses on the National Register of Historic Places in Georgia (U.S. state)
Buildings and structures in Elbert County, Georgia
Government buildings completed in 1894
National Register of Historic Places in Elbert County, Georgia